Inquirer 990 Television was a Philippine terrestrial television news channel owned by Trans-Radio Broadcasting Corporation (a subsidiary of the Philippine Daily Inquirer). It was the television counterpart of radio news station DZIQ 990, broadcasting in the AM band and was the fifth station to simulcast its radio stream to television, after DZMM (DZMM TeleRadyo), DZRH (DZRH News Television), DWAN (MMDA Teleradyo), DZRJ (Radyo Bandido TV), DWIZ (IZTV) and Radyo5 92.3 News FM  (One PH). Originally on live streaming, it became available as a terrestrial subchannel on BEAM TV, and some programs are also available on analog free TV Channel 31.

Aside from the main programming feed from its radio counterpart, Inquirer 990 TV also airs its exclusive original programs.

Programs

Final programs
 Banner Story
 Banner Story Evening Edition
 Banner Story Late-Night Edition
 Good Morning Inquirer
 Good Afternoon Inquirer
 MTRCB Uncut
 Level Up Showbiz Saturdate
 Level Up Showbiz Sundate
 Nuwebe Nobenta Report
 Radyo Inquirer 990 Special Report
 Radyo Inquirer News Update
 Langit sa Lupa
 Kakaiba Ka
 Wow It's Showbiz
 Go Malasakit
 Pera at Kabuhayan
 Isyu ng Bayan
 Showbiz Live
 Sports IQ
 Bantay OCW with Susan K and Co.
 Let's Talk Mag-Usap Tayo
 Petiks Petiks Lang
 Raw Talk
 Isahan

Former programs
 Stop Krimen
 Aida G Daily
 Partners
 PCSO Lottery Draw
 Gabay ng Pamilyang Marino
 Pambansang Balita Alas-Diyes
 Dyaryo sa Radyo
 Everyday Goodwill
 Tell Ms. Tere
 Dear Ate Reysie
 KlIQ Music
 Buti na Lang, May SSS!
 Cockpihan
 Talk. Shop. Asia.
 Radyo Inquirer Newsbreak
 Your Health, Your Wealth
 Ladies Talk
 Dermclinic on Radio
 Perfect Morning with Brenda Domato
 Kuwentuhan Pa More
 Health TV Embassy
 Breakfast Club
 Primero Balita
 Pambansang Balita Nuwebe Nobenta
 Primetime Balita
 Headlines Ngayon
 Radyo Inquirer Balita
 Radyo Inquirer Balita sa Umaga
 Radyo Inquirer Balita sa Tanghali
 Radyo Inquirer Balita sa Hapon
 Radyo Inquirer Balita sa Gabi

Personalities

Anchors and hosts
Rhommel Balasbas (moved to DZBB)
Fernan De Guzman
Arlyn Dela Cruz-Bernal† (News Director)
Dona Dominguez-Cargullo
Ed Dural
Noel Ferrer
Den Macaranas (moved to PTV 4)
Ira Panganiban (moved to DZRJ 810)
Jupiter Torres (moved to Voice Over PTV4)
Louie Sebastian (moved to DZRH)
Kilay
Jake Maderazo (Station Manager)
Joel Aba (moved to GMA Network)
Mamey France Simeon
Jonas Virtudazo
Ervin Santiago
Izel Abanilla
Jose Boy Romero (moved to DZRH)
Rev. Jerome Quinto
Liza Soriano (moved To DZRH)
Susan K (moved to UNTV)
Joey Austria
Cristina Caoile
JC Kwads

Correspondents
Erwin Aguilon
Jan Escosio (moved to GMA Network)
Angellic Jordan
Chona Yu

Former talents
Rohanissa Abbas
Alvin Barcelona (moved to PTV 4)
Ricky Brozas
Mariel Cruz
Cyrille Cupino
Jay Dones
Aida Gonzales (moved to DWIZ)
Arnell Ignacio (moved back to DZBB)
Cecille Lardizabal
Mark Makalalad (moved to DZBB)
Jong Manlapaz
Ruel Perez
Justinne Punsalang (moved to TV5)
Kristine Sabillo (moved to ABS-CBN)
Girlie Sevilla (moved to Radyo Veritas 846)
Jay Sonza
Caesar Soriano (moved to PTV 4)
Joee Guilas (moved to PTV 4)
Ramon Tulfo
Isa Avendaño-Umali (moved to DZBB)
Clarize Austria (moved to CNN Philippines)
Reysie Amado
Tere Gonzales (moved to 91.5 Win Radio)
Len Montaño
Noel Talacay (moved to DZXL and PTV 4)
Rod Lagusad (moved to PTV 4)

See also
DZIQ Nueve Nobenta (defunct channel)
Philippine Daily Inquirer
DZMM TeleRadyo
Radyo Bandido TV
DZRH News Television
GMA News TV (defunct channel)
One PH

References

External links

Radyo Inquirer live streaming on USTREAM 

Philippine Daily Inquirer
Defunct television networks in the Philippines
24-hour television news channels in the Philippines
Television channels and stations established in 2016
Digital television stations in the Philippines
2016 establishments in the Philippines